Thomas Zampach (born December 27, 1969 in Frankfurt am Main) is a German former footballer who became a coach. He is currently kicker for the Frankfurt Galaxy.

Soccer career
He made his debut on the professional league level in the 2. Bundesliga for 1. FSV Mainz 05 on August 13, 1991 when he came on as a substitute in the 70th minute in a game against FC Rot-Weiß Erfurt.

American Football career
From 2013 to 2015 he was the kicker of the Frankfurt Universe in the German Football League 2. On March 13, 2022 the Frankfurt Galaxy of the European League of Football signed him to their roster, making him the oldest player in the league to this date with 52.

Professional statistics

References

1969 births
Living people
German footballers
German football managers
1. FSV Mainz 05 players
Eintracht Frankfurt players
Association football defenders
Frankfurt Galaxy (ELF) players
Footballers from Frankfurt
German players of American football
American football placekickers